The Portland Fire Bureau of the city of Portland, Oregon owns and operates Fireboats in Portland, Oregon.

In 1973 the Fire Bureau had the responsibility for patrolling the harbor transferred to it from the Police Bureau.  The Karl Prehn and the L.V. Jenkins were added to the fleet at that time.  These smaller vessels were equipped for both firefighting and constabulary duties.  The Bureau maintained seven vessels in the 1970s—its largest extent.

See also
 Fireboats of Baltimore
 Fireboats of Boston
 Fireboats of Chicago
 Fireboats of Connecticut
 Fireboats of Detroit
 Fireboats of Duluth
 Fireboats of Houston
 Fireboats of Jacksonville, Florida
 Fireboats of Long Beach, California
 Fireboats of Milwaukee
 Fireboats of New Orleans
 Fireboats of New York City
 Fireboats of Philadelphia

 Fireboats of San Diego
 Fireboats of San Francisco
 Fireboats of Toronto
 Fireboats of Vancouver
 Fireboats on the Mississippi River system

References

Portland
Government of Portland, Oregon